A medical drama is a television show or film in which events center upon a hospital, an ambulance staff, or any medical environment. Most recent medical dramatic programming go beyond the events pertaining to the characters' jobs and portray some aspects of their personal lives. A typical medical drama might have a storyline in which two doctors fall in love. Communications theorist Marshall McLuhan, in his 1964 work on the nature of media, predicted success for this particular genre on TV because the medium "creates an obsession with bodily welfare". The longest running medical drama in the world is the British series Casualty, airing since 1986, and the longest running medical soap opera is General Hospital running since 1963.

History
City Hospital, which first aired in 1951, is usually considered to be the first televised medical drama. (The first serialized medical drama was probably the Dr. Kildare film series (1937-1947), starring a number of actors in the eponymous role, and Lionel Barrymore throughout the series.)  Medic, which featured Richard Boone, ran two seasons, from 1954 to 1956. The genre became a staple of prime time television with the enormous popularity of Dr. Kildare and Ben Casey, both debuting in 1961. The BBC series Dr. Finlay's Casebook (1962–1971) is an early example of another common variant of the genre in which a medical practice is used as a focus for stories detailing the life of a (usually small) community. The long running Australian series A Country Practice (1981–1993) is a later example of this subgenre. From 1969 to 1976, the series Marcus Welby, M.D. and Medical Center were extremely popular for their both orthodox and unorthodox way of presenting medical cases. In 1972, the long-running series, Emergency!, starring Robert Fuller and Julie London, was the first medical drama ever to combine both, a fire department paramedic rescue program with an emergency room in a general hospital, which also focused on real-life rescues. Also in 1972, the first episode of M*A*S*H aired; the show's tone was generally comedic, but dark—poignant moments emanating from the death caused by war were not uncommon. This trend of comedy with undercurrents of darkness in medical TV shows can also be seen in St. Elsewhere, Doogie Howser, M.D., House M.D., Grey's Anatomy, Scrubs, Code Black and Chicago Med. In 1986, Casualty started airing on BBC One in the United Kingdom. Casualty continues to be aired, making it the longest running TV medical drama. Its sister show Holby City aired from 1999 to 2022. In 2000, the BBC commissioned Doctors, a medical drama soap that has continued to air since and has become the BBC's flagship daytime series.

According to Professor George Ikkos, the president of the psychiatry sector of the Royal Society of Medicine, medical dramas have accumulated large audiences because the characters in the shows are often depicted as everyday citizens who have extraordinary careers, which promotes a sense of relatability among viewers. Medical drama is sometimes used in medical education; a systematic review of such uses indicated that it is a "feasible and acceptable" complement to medical education.

See also
List of medical drama television programs
Medical fiction

References

External links

 
Drama genres
Soap operas
Television genres
Works about medicine
Film genres